Christopher Honey (born 10 November 1961) is a Barbadian diver. He competed in the men's 3 metre springboard event at the 1988 Summer Olympics, during his time at University of Toronto, finishing in 33rd place.

References

External links
 

1961 births
Living people
Barbadian male divers
Olympic divers of Barbados
Divers at the 1988 Summer Olympics
Place of birth missing (living people)